Marijan "Mario" Kraljević (born April 30, 1970 in Pforzheim, West Germany) is former Slovenian-Croatian professional basketball player.

National team career
Kraljević was a member of the senior Slovenia national basketball team. He competed at EuroBasket 1993, EuroBasket 1995, EuroBasket 1999, EuroBasket 2001, and EuroBasket 2003. He represented Slovenia officially in 73 games, and scored a total of 219 points.

Personal life
His son Luka, is also a basketball player.

Career statistics

EuroLeague

|-
| style="text-align:left;"| 2000–01
| style="text-align:left;"| Saint Petersburg Lions
| 9 || 4 || 17.0 || .462 || .000 || .563 || 2.7 || .7 || .7 || .1 || 5.0 || 4.1
|-

External links
 Euroleague Profile 
 Eurobasket.com Profile 
 Fiba Profile 
 Basketnews.lt Profile

1970 births
Living people
Slovenian men's basketball players
KK Olimpija players
Centers (basketball)
ABA League players
Panellinios B.C. players